Edmond "Edo" Azemi (born 19 September 1980) is a Kosovar-Albanian professional basketball player who plays for KB Prishtina in Kosovo Basketball Superleague and in Balkan International Basketball League. Edmond Azemi is one of the most successful players in the history of basketball in Kosovo. He started the career in Kosovo in KB Prishtina. Most of the years he played with KB Prishtina team where he made history winning 10x Kosovo Basketball superleague, 9x Kosovo Cups, 3x Kosovo Supercups and 2x Balkan League.

Edmond Azemi is a member of the Kosovo national basketball team from 2011. He was part of the Albanian national basketball team from 2004 to 2010. Azemi also holds a Croatian passport.

Personal
He was born in Doboj, SFR Yugoslavia to Albanian father and Croatian mother. He spent his teen years in Pristina, Kosovo and also started the career in KB Prishtina where he made history. Now Edmond Azemi lives in Pristina, he is married to Elma Ibro and they have two children.

Professional career

2005-2010 season
In 2005-06 season, Edmond Azemi played in KB Valbona Tropoje in Albanian Basketball League and also in Eurocup Challenge where he was one of the best players of his team. He averaged with 9.0 points, 2.0 rebounds and 1.0 steals per game. Also in 2005-06 season he played with KB Prishtina where he averaged with 10.3 points and 2.6 assists per game. Then in 2006-07 he played for KR Basket in the Icelandic Úrvalsdeild and helped them win the national championship. For the season he averaged 9.1 points, 4.2 rebounds, 1.6 assists and 2.4 steals in 12 games played. From Iceland he returned in Kosovo at KB Prishtina to play just two seasons and to go to Macedonian basketball superleague at KK Lirija team where he played 13 games with average - 12.2 points, 4.3 rebounds and 1.9 assists per game.

2010-2015 seasons
From KK Lirija, Azemi returned again in KB Sigal Prishtina in 2010-11 where he won Kosovo Basketball Superleague, Kosovo Basketball Superleague MVP of 2010/11 season, and also the Kosovo Cup. In 2010/11 he averaged with very impressive stats: 22.4 points, 5.2 rebounds and 5.1 assists per game. In 2013/14 season Edmond Azemi with his team Sigal Prishtina played in Balkan International Basketball League for the first time in history. In the first season in BIBL Sigal Prishtina went to the final four of this league where they were organizers of this event. During this season of BIBL, Azemi averaged with 4.1 points and 1.8 rebounds in 16 games played. The 2014-15 season was one of the best in history not just for Azemi but also for KB Sigal Prishtina because in this season they won Balkan League for the first time and also Kosovo Superleague Trophy. In this winning season, Azemi averaged with 7.8 points, 4.2 rebounds and 2.1 assists per game in 17 games played.

Honors
 13x  Kosovo Basketball Superleague champion (02,03,06,07,08,09,10,11,14,15,16,17,19)
 13x  Kosovo Cup winner (03,05,06,07,08,09,10,13,14,16,17,18,19)
 4x Kosovo Supercups winner (2005,2006,2014, 2018)
 Icelandic League champion (2007)
 Balkan League champion (2015,2016)

References

External links
Edmond Azemi at fiba.com
Edmond Azemi at Eurobasket.com
Edmond Azemi at Balkanleague.net
Edmond Azemi at Fibaeurope.com
Edmond Azemi at Bgbasket.com
Úrvalsdeild statistics at kki.is

1980 births
Living people
People from Doboj
Albanian men's basketball players
Kosovan men's basketball players
KB Prishtina players
KK MZT Skopje players
KR men's basketball players
Small forwards
Úrvalsdeild karla (basketball) players
Kosovo Albanians
Kosovan people of Croatian descent
Albanian people of Croatian descent
Kosovan people of Bosnia and Herzegovina descent
Croatian people of Albanian descent  
Croatian people of Kosovan descent